The Poroporo River is a river of the Gisborne Region of New Zealand's North Island. It flows east from its sources in the eastern foothills of the Raukumara Range, reaching the Waiapu River close to its mouth, having shared the Waiapu's bed since the town of Tikitiki.

See also
 List of rivers of New Zealand

References

Rivers of the Gisborne District
Rivers of New Zealand